Christus am Ölberge (in English, Christ on the Mount of Olives), Op. 85, is an oratorio by Ludwig van Beethoven portraying the emotional turmoil of Jesus in the garden of Gethsemane prior to his crucifixion. It was begun in the fall of 1802, soon after his completion of the Heiligenstadt Testament, as indicated by evidence in the Wielhorsky sketchbook. The libretto in German is by the poet , editor of the Wiener Zeitung, with whom Beethoven worked closely. It was written in a very short period; in a letter to Breitkopf & Härtel written shortly after the oratorio's completion, Beethoven spoke of having written it in "a few weeks", although he later claimed that the piece required no more than 14 days to complete. It was first performed on April 5, 1803 at the Theater an der Wien in Vienna; in 1811, it was revised by Beethoven for publication by Breitkopf & Härtel. The 10 years that passed between the composition of the work and its publication resulted in its being assigned a relatively high opus number. The piece premiered in the United States in  1809; it was Beethoven's first  success in the United States.

Composition
The work is a dramatic oratorio and is considered a much more humanistic portrayal of the Christ passion than other settings, such as those by Bach. It concludes at the point of Jesus personally accepting his fate, placing the emphasis on his own decision rather than the later Crucifixion or Resurrection. The oratorio is scored for soprano, tenor, and bass soloists, with standard SATB chorus and symphony orchestra.  The tenor sings as Jesus, with the soprano as a seraph (angel) and the bass as Peter. A complete performance lasts approximately 50 minutes.

Beethoven's only oratorio, he was quite critical of the piece and of the performance of the orchestra and chorus at its premiere. He panned Huber's libretto, saying, in an 1824 letter to the Gesellschaft für Musikfreunde, "Let us leave out of consideration the value of poems of this sort. We all know that allowances are to be made... so far as I am concerned, I would rather set Homer, Klopstock, Schiller to music. If they offer difficulties to overcome, these immortal poets at least are worthy of it." (Beethoven eventually did set Schiller to music in his monumental Ninth Symphony, nearly twenty years after the oratorio.) The editors at Breitkopf & Härtel agreed with Beethoven's critical assessment of the text, and Christian Schreiber was enlisted to make massive changes to the libretto. However, upon reviewing the changes, Beethoven still was not happy, saying, "I know that the text is extremely bad, but if even a bad text is conceived as a whole entity, it is very difficult to avoid disrupting it by individual corrections".

Reception
The critical response to the work's initial performance was mixed; while the Zeitung für die Elegante Welt's critic wrote that the oratorio contained "a few admirable passages", a review in the Freymüthige Blätter called the piece "too artificial in structure and lacking expressiveness, especially in the vocal music", and claimed that the performance "was unable to achieve really marked approbation". It has since drifted somewhat into obscurity, and is rarely performed, being regarded by some as falling below Beethoven's usual standards of excellence.  However, despite conflicting contemporary critical reports and Beethoven's own misgivings about the libretto, "...after its premiere in 1803 the work was performed four times in 1804, and repeated every year, always drawing full houses, until it was banned in 1825 by the Hofmusikgraf."

The "Welten singen..." finale chorus has enjoyed some popularity on its own, usually being rendered as a "Hallelujah", frequently performed by church, high school, and college choirs.

Recordings

Notes

External links 
 
 German libretto of Christus am Ölberge

Compositions by Ludwig van Beethoven
1803 compositions
Passion settings
Oratorios based on the Bible
German-language oratorios
Gethsemane
Works based on the New Testament